Maoz Samia (also transliterated Maoz Samya, born 14 December 1987) is a retired Israeli footballer who played for Hapoel Marmorek.

Personal life
Samia is Jewish, he grew up in Ramla.

Club career
Samia joined Ironi Ramla's youth set up at the age of 9.  He quickly moved up the club's ranks, becoming a regular in Ramla's senior squad at the age of 16.

In 2004, Underwriter In Hapoel Petah Tikva.

Retirement
In January 2021, Samia announced his retirement from football at the age of 33.

References

1987 births
Living people
Israeli footballers
Hapoel Petah Tikva F.C. players
Maccabi Netanya F.C. players
Hapoel Kfar Saba F.C. players
Sektzia Ness Ziona F.C. players
Hapoel Jerusalem F.C. players
Beitar Tel Aviv Bat Yam F.C. players
Hapoel Bnei Lod F.C. players
Hapoel Nir Ramat HaSharon F.C. players
Israeli Premier League players
Liga Leumit players
Footballers from Ramla
Israeli people of Libyan-Jewish descent
Association football central defenders